Homewood is an unincorporated community and census-designated place (CDP) in Horry County, South Carolina, United States, just north of Conway in the northeastern part of the state. It was first listed as a CDP in the 2020 census with a population of 1,693. 

Homewood is located at the junction of South Carolina Highway 319 and U.S. Highway 701. There is an elementary school in the community. Many of the inhabitants make a living from family farms, growing tobacco, corn, soybeans, and tomatoes.

Demographics

2020 census

Note: the US Census treats Hispanic/Latino as an ethnic category. This table excludes Latinos from the racial categories and assigns them to a separate category. Hispanics/Latinos can be of any race.

References

Census-designated places in South Carolina
Census-designated places in Horry County, South Carolina
Unincorporated communities in South Carolina
Unincorporated communities in Horry County, South Carolina